"Don't Stop" is a song by British-American rock band Fleetwood Mac, written by vocalist and keyboard player Christine McVie. The song was sung by guitarist Lindsey Buckingham and Christine McVie, and it was a single taken from the band's hit album Rumours (1977).

One of the band's most enduring hits, "Don't Stop" was released as the third single from Rumours, peaking at  3 on the US Billboard Hot 100 in October 1977. In the UK, "Don't Stop" followed "Go Your Own Way" as the second single from the album and peaked at No. 32.

Music and concept 
"Don't Stop" has been described musically as a pop rock song. It reflects Christine McVie's feelings after her separation from Fleetwood Mac's bass guitarist, John McVie, after eight years of marriage. "'Don't Stop' was just a feeling. It just seemed to be a pleasant revelation to have that 'yesterday's gone'," McVie remembers in The Fleetwood Mac Story: Rumours and Lies, "It might have, I guess, been directed more toward John, but I'm just definitely not a pessimist."

The song is widely misperceived as having one lead singer. However, Buckingham sings the first verse, while Christine McVie sings the second. Both singers sing the third verse simultaneously. The chorus features alternating vocals by Buckingham and Christine McVie.

Reception
Cash Box said that "Mick Fleetwood and John McVie comprise a deadly rhythm section, especially when they're working with a straight ahead shuffle like this one."

Political usage 
The song was the theme music for United States presidential candidate Bill Clinton's 1992 presidential campaign, and was played at the 1992 Democratic National Convention during its final night balloon drop. Upon winning the election, Clinton persuaded the group to perform the song for his inaugural ball in 1993.

At the 2000 convention, Clinton ended his speech by saying, "Keep putting people first. Keep building those bridges. And don't stop thinking about tomorrow!" Immediately after the final sentence, the song began playing over the loudspeakers. The song was also played for Clinton's appearances at the 2004, 2008 and 2012 conventions.

Additionally, the song was played at Conservative Conferences during David Cameron's tenure as party leader.

Personnel 
 Christine McVie – piano, tack piano, Vox Continental, lead vocals (certain lines on choruses, 2nd verse and fade out)
 Mick Fleetwood – drums
 John McVie – bass guitar
 Lindsey Buckingham – electric guitars, lead vocals (majority of song)
 Stevie Nicks – tambourine, backing vocals

Charts

Weekly charts

Year-end charts

Certifications

References 

1977 singles
Fleetwood Mac songs
Nina Nesbitt songs
Songs written by Christine McVie
Song recordings produced by Ken Caillat
Song recordings produced by Richard Dashut
Warner Records singles
Cashbox number-one singles
RPM Top Singles number-one singles
1976 songs
Male–female vocal duets
Bill Clinton
Political party songs